IBM 1070 Process Communication System was IBM's communication system with analog-to-digital and digital-to-analog conversion functions that was announced in 1964 for the process industries (oil refinery, iron & steel, pharmaceutical and other industries).

Configuration
The 1070 System could be configured from:
 IBM 1026: IBM 1030/1050/1060/1070 Transmission Control Unit
 IBM 1071: Terminal Control Unit
 IBM 1072: Terminal Multiplexer
 IBM 1073: Latching Contact Operate Model 1
 IBM 1073: Counter Terminal Model 2
 IBM 1073: Digital-Pulse Converter Model 3
 IBM 1074: Binary Display
 IBM 1075: Decimal Display
 IBM 1076: Manual Binary Input
 IBM 1077: Manual Decimal Input
 IBM 1078: Pulse Counter

On the IBM System/360 or System/370 computer side, attachment was done through IBM 2701 Data Adapter Unit, 2702 Data Communications Unit, or other remote communications units.

The 1070 System was announced in April 1964, at the same time as the IBM System/360 announcement, and became available in the following year.

See also
Process industry

References

External links
IBM Announcement Letter - IBM 1070

1070